Rhamphochromis brevis is a species of cichlid endemic to Lake Malawi where it is a predator of other fish and is also an important food fish.
This species is not listed in FishBase which regards it as a synonym of Rhamphochromis woodi but Catalog of Fishes treats it as a valid species.

References

brevis
Taxa named by Ethelwynn Trewavas
Fish described in 1935